Pianico (Bergamasque:  or ) is a comune (municipality) in the Province of Bergamo in the Italian region of Lombardy, located about  northeast of Milan and about  northeast of Bergamo.

Pianico borders the following municipalities: Castro, Lovere, Solto Collina, Sovere.

Demographic evolution

References